Jahan Ghazzawi Aouni (Arabic: جهان غزاوي عوني‎) (1918 - September 1956) was a Lebanese writer, literary critic, and teacher. She was born in Tripoli and grew up there and studied at the Tallian Institute. She dropped out of school after her mother died to take care of the house, so she learned my age. She taught from 1946 until her death at the age of 38 or 40. She has been known for her work in the area of women's empowerment, has contributed to many charitable social activities, and her home has been a moral good. She was nicknamed Vihah. She left manuscript works, numerous articles and stories published in newspapers, with notice. She wrote several articles about Mei Zia, and she well known for defending her in literary criticism.

Biography 
Jahan Ghazzawi was born in Tripoli in 1918 in the period of administration of occupied enemy territory or in 1916 in the Ottoman Tripoli period. Since she was young, her tendency towards literature has been to write her thoughts about life and her feelings in the form of a short story or essay. She learned at the Tallian Institute in Tripoli. She had to drop out of school after her mother died to take care of the house. But she kept reading and from that she learned my age.She taught since 1946, after the independence of Lebanon, working in Tripoli's official schools for 10 years. It was known for its particular teaching style, most notably "the duality of tenacity by imposing respect for order and by being agile and passionate in the course of fulfilling tasks."

She was teaching research, used to be swarms of yams in the school lobby and in playground spaces. "

Jahan Ghazzawi died in September 1956.

Literary career 
She was a member of the Northern Literary Association.She was nicknamed Vihah. Although she wrote many articles in various literary journals, such as "The Voice of Women," "Etiquette," "The Letter," and "The Literature." It has manuscripts, including the first story written by "The Dark Jewel," and a study of Mei increasing its title of "Mei Nebula." "Jehan Ghazawi Awani: Vihah, 1916-1956. "

She exchanged messages with the literature of her time, including Samira Azam, and defended Mei's increased literary career.

Stories 
In the Lebanese magazine "The Voice of Women," she wrote several stories and literary essays classifying an artistic anthology, the day of her editor - in - chief, Edvik Gradini Shibub. Her stories published in 1952 are "The Gift of Destiny," "Happiness" and "The Game of Life." In her story "Saad," she talks about a poor student named Sahid, who was one of her schoolgirls.Brie Issa Fatoh, writer of "Adipat Arab: Course and Studies "The three stories of Jahan Azzawi show: "A true spirit of motherhood, compassion for the poor, tormented and deprived, and for those small, vulnerable creatures who have not yet been able to make their way into life." He said of her style, "In Jahan Ghazwai's transparent and agile style, and in her smooth and sweet language, she tends to portray poetic words that she knows how to choose with elegance, fine taste, sound nature... And we don't see her abandoning this poetic style in everything she writes. If God had come to this talented, creative writing, she would have given us much of what she was destined to give. "

Poetry 
The book "The Literature of Tripoli and the North" gave her some notice, and a number of poems were published in the newspapers of her time. The Epistle of the Papyrus says of her poetry, "Her poetry revolves around her personal and emotional concerns. She tends to meditate on the night's slumber over the romantic habit of poets, and she has poetry calling for the rejection of melancholy, the hugging of life. With her hair a touch of mild grief that reveals the weariness of her sense, the warmth of her feelings. She wrote poetry with weight and rhyme, as she wrote it in what is known as action poetry, and wrote prose poem. Her language is flush and soft, and her imagination is energetic. It's diverse in its light and rhymes, highlighting its tendency to regenerate. "

Studies and Criticism 
She is best known for her studies on Mi Zia and her defense in literary criticism. She and Em Faris Ibrahim had a wide - ranging discussion on the newspapers of the "Telegraph" literary supplement about Mei & apos book "Equality Increase." She also had a beautiful book, MeV.

"Her troubled life" with criticism. In a letter sent to Samira Azam on 6 June 1955:

"My study of me dates back to five years in which she collected her 14 books together with several volumes of" Crescent, "" The Excerpt, "" The Letter, "" The New Woman, "what was said about her and her during her visit to Lebanon in 1922, what was said about her as well as about her, and about her, and about her early death."

She have kept some documents and letters exchanged between Mei Ziad and Gebran Khalil Gebran.

Her Impact 
She is a revered figure in some of Tripoli's elite, and they have paid tribute to her, including Maha Kayal, who said in 2009 that "This Tripoli literary and intellectual product in boys and young people has interspersed with her life activities as a girl responsible for contributing to the management of her parental home, and then as a wife and mother caring for a family of two and three children. These tasks, which were considered to be the only job for all the girls of her generation, were not enough, their energy was great, and they were also distributed in school (1946-1956) and as literature, the product of which was published in many magazines... Many were provided through Lebanese radio. Of course, we add to all this scientific mobility her role as a social activist in the field she loved.

It must be said here that this groundbreaking example of changing the traditional stereotype of women in the early part of the century is a small one in Tripoli, which can be described socially as a tradition - preserving city and where the dynamic of social change as a city is still relatively slower than that of the Lebanese capital, Beirut. It is true that Tripoli has historically been described as a city of science and scientists, but this characterization was of "the world of men" in it, "and a mystical reverence described as" Tripoli, glamorous in a conservative masculine society, out of the lavish way of life that a woman lived, and broke the yields of social constraints, as if taken from her Persian name: The world and the world, a literary launch station for Lebanon and the Arab world. She was a solid, transparent, tortured woman who grew up from inside the Old City, but her jellyfish went off at the height of her tender and her youth. "

Personal life 
She got married in 1941, Her husband name is tahsen awni postmaster of Tripoli. Of their children, Nassima Awni al-Khatib, is the wife of Sami al-Khatib, and Hassan Walid Auni, born in Tripoli, 1950.

References 

1918 births
20th-century women educators
People from Tripoli, Libya
Lebanese educators
1956 deaths